is a medium-sized Japanese–English Dictionary published by Shogakukan. The third edition, published in 2001, has some 90,000 entries.

Japanese dictionaries
Shogakukan